Samia Muhammad Hagrass Ahmed (born 20 January 1996) is an Egyptian synchronized swimmer. She competed in the women's duet at the 2016 Summer Olympics.

References

External links

1996 births
Living people
Egyptian synchronized swimmers
Olympic synchronized swimmers of Egypt
Synchronized swimmers at the 2016 Summer Olympics